Cirsium vulgare, the spear thistle, bull thistle, or common thistle, is a species of the Asteraceae genus Cirsium, native throughout most of Europe (north to 66°N, locally 68°N), Western Asia (east to the Yenisei Valley), and northwestern Africa (Atlas Mountains). It is also naturalised in North America, Africa, and Australia and is an invasive weed in some areas. It is the national flower of Scotland.

The plant provides a great deal of nectar for pollinators. It was rated in the top 10 for most nectar production (nectar per unit cover per year) in a UK plants survey conducted by the AgriLand project which is supported by the UK Insect Pollinators Initiative. Marsh thistle, Cirsium palustre, was ranked in first place while this thistle was ranked in sixth place. It also was a top producer of nectar sugar in another study in Britain, ranked third with a production per floral unit of (2300 ± 400 μg).

Description
It is a tall biennial or short-lived monocarpic thistle, forming a rosette of leaves and a taproot up to 70 cm long in the first year, and a flowering stem 1–1.5 m tall in the second (rarely third or fourth) year. It sometimes will function as an annual, flowering in the first year. The stem is winged, with numerous longitudinal spine-tipped wings along its full length. The inflorescence is 2.5–5 cm diameter, pink-purple, with all the florets of similar form (no division into disc and ray florets). The seeds are 5 mm long, with a downy pappus, which assists in wind dispersal. As in other species of Cirsium (but unlike species in the related genus Carduus), the pappus hairs are feathery with fine side hairs.

Ecology
Spear thistle is often a ruderal species, colonising bare disturbed ground, but also persists well on heavily grazed land as it is unpalatable to most grazing animals. Nitrogen-rich soils help increase its proliferation. The flowers are a rich nectar source used by numerous pollinating insects, including honey bees, wool-carder bees, and many butterflies. The seeds are eaten by goldfinches, linnets and greenfinches. The seeds are dispersed by wind, mud, water, and possibly also by ants; they do not show significant long-term dormancy, most germinating soon after dispersal and only a few lasting up to four years in the soil seed bank. Seed is also often spread by human activity such as hay bales.

Weed status
Spear thistle is designated an "injurious weed" under the UK Weeds Act 1959, and a noxious weed in Australia and in nine US states. Spread is only by seed, not by root fragments as in the related creeping thistle C. arvense. It is best cleared from land by hoeing and deep cutting of the taproot before seeds mature; regular cultivation also prevents its establishment.

Despite this label, the plant has beneficial qualities beyond its very high nectar production. It produces seeds eaten by the American goldfinch, down from seed pods that is used by those birds for nesting material, and serves as a host plant for the Painted lady butterfly. The monarch butterfly and other larger-sized butterflies can feed easily from the flowers due to their large size. Some farmers, due to its usefulness as part of the natural food chain, may find it useful to allow it to grow in beetle banks. The supports for pollinators and pest-eating birds could outweigh its drawbacks. In areas where it does not form monocultures it may also be welcome as a part of a meadow landscape.

Other names
Common names include bull thistle, Scots, Scottish, or Scotch thistle, and common thistle.

Uses
The stems can be peeled (removing their spiny surfaces) and then steamed or boiled. The tap roots can be eaten raw or cooked, but are only palatable on young thistles that have not yet flowered. The dried florets steeped in water are used in rural Italy for curdling goats' milk in preparation for making cheese.

In culture

The plant features in some Scottish ceremonies such as the "Riding of the Marches", held annually in Langholm in July. The 1992 specimen measured six feet in length

Spear thistle is also the emblem of Newton Regis in England.

References

External links

 
 
 
 
 

vulgare
Edible plants
Flora of Europe
Flora of North Africa
Flora of Asia
Plants described in 1798
Invasive plant species in Japan